Astraeus morganii is a species of false earthstar in the family Diplocystaceae. The fungus is found in the central to southern United States, extending southwards to Mexico. It is closely related to Astraeus pteridis, but has smaller fruit bodies and larger spores. The specific epithet honors American botanist Andrew Price Morgan.

References

External links

Boletales
Fungi described in 2013
Fungi of North America